Colony is a neighborhood in southwestern Lexington, Kentucky, United States. Its boundaries are Parkers Mill Road to the south and east, Versailles Road to the north, and New Circle Road to the west.

Neighborhood statistics

 Area: 
 Population: 306
 Population density: 1,999 people per square mile
 Median household income (2010): $72,162

References

Neighborhoods in Lexington, Kentucky